Tjøtta is a former municipality in Nordland county, Norway.  The  municipality existed from 1862 until its dissolution in 1965.  The municipality was centered around the island of Tjøtta plus the mainland to the east and south as well as over 3000 islands, islets, and skerries to the west.  The administrative centre of Tjøtta was the village of Tjøtta, located on the island of Tjøtta, where the Tjøtta Church is located.

History
The municipality of Tjøtta was established in 1862 when it was separated from Alstahaug Municipality. Initially, Tjøtta had a population of 2,781. On 1 July 1917, the southeastern district of Tjøtta (population: 1,097) was separated to become the new Vevelstad Municipality, leaving Tjøtta with 2,287 inhabitants. On 1 July 1920 the Giskåen farm with 10 inhabitants was transferred to Vevelstad.

During the 1960s, there were many municipal mergers across Norway due to the work of the Schei Committee.  On 1 January 1964, the part of Tjøtta located on the eastern part of the island of Alsten (population: 180) was incorporated into Leirfjord Municipality. On 1 January 1965, the Skogsholmen island area in western Tjøtta (population: 196) was incorporated into Vega Municipality.  The rest of Tjøtta Municipality (population: 1,477) was merged with most of Alstahaug Municipality (population: 920) and the town of Sandnessjøen (population: 3,856).

Name
The municipality (originally the parish) is named after the old Tjøtta farm since the first Tjøtta Church was built there. The name of the farm (and the island on which it is located) comes from the word  which is a noun describing the "upper part of a thigh". The name was likely used to refer to the shape of the island.

Government
While it existed, this municipality was responsible for primary education (through 10th grade), outpatient health services, senior citizen services, unemployment, social services, zoning, economic development, and municipal roads. During its existence, this municipality was governed by a municipal council of elected representatives, which in turn elected a mayor.

Municipal council
The municipal council  of Tjøtta was made up of 17 representatives that were elected to four year terms.  The party breakdown of the final municipal council was as follows:

Media gallery

See also
List of former municipalities of Norway

References

Alstahaug
Former municipalities of Norway
1862 establishments in Norway
1965 disestablishments in Norway